Oliver Aiken Howland,  (April 18, 1847 – March 9, 1905) was a Toronto lawyer and political figure. He represented Toronto South in the Legislative Assembly of Ontario from 1894 to 1898 and was mayor of Toronto from 1901 to 1902.

He was born in Lambton Mills, Canada West (later Etobicoke) in 1847, the son of Sir William Pearce Howland, and was educated at Upper Canada College and the University of Toronto. He studied law with Matthew Crooks Cameron, was called to the bar in 1875 and set up practice in Toronto. Howland was later named King's Counsel. He was a vice-president of the Canadian Bar Association and served on the council of the Canadian Institute from 1894 to 1895. Howland was president of the Internal Deep Waterways Association and chairman of the Canadian branch of the International Commission on Deep Water Ways. He was also a director of Bishop Ridley College. He was also a member of the Orange Order in Canada.

Howland was appointed a Companion of the Order of St Michael and St George (CMG) during the visit to Toronto of the Duke and Duchess of Cornwall and York (later King George V and Queen Mary) in October 1901.

His older brother William Holmes Howland also served as 25th Mayor of Toronto a decade and a half earlier.

References 

The Canadian parliamentary companion, 1897 JA Gemmill

The Canadian men and women of the time : a handbook of Canadian biography, HJ Morgan (1898)
Commemorative biographical record of the county of York, Ontario ... (1907)

1847 births
1905 deaths
Mayors of Toronto
Progressive Conservative Party of Ontario MPPs
University of Toronto alumni
Upper Canada College alumni
Canadian Companions of the Order of St Michael and St George
Canadian King's Counsel
Canadian people of American descent